Epiblema batangensis is a species of moth of the family Tortricidae. It is found in China (Henan, Sichuan, Yunnan).

References

Moths described in 1939
Eucosmini